Cizhou may refer to:

Modern locations
Cizhou, Hebei (磁州), a town in Ci County, Hebei, China, named after the historical prefecture

Historical locations
Cizhou (in modern Hebei) (磁州), a prefecture between the 6th and 20th centuries in modern Hebei, China
Cizhou (in modern Shanxi) (慈州), a prefecture between the 7th and 12th centuries in modern Shanxi, China
Cizhou (in modern Inner Mongolia) (慈州), a prefecture between the 10th and 11th centuries in modern Inner Mongolia, China

See also
Ci (disambiguation)